Corinne Heraud was formerly a Chief Inspector of the Missile inspection team in Iraq, while working for the United Nation's Monitoring, Verification and Inspection Commission (UNMOVIC). Prior to that she held various other posts at UNMOVIC and had been seconded from the French Government to carry out work for UNMOVIC's predecessor, the United Nations Special Commission (UNSCOM).

It is believed Chief Engineer (Lieutenant Colonel) Heraud was a leading contributor to the missile section of UNMOVIC's working document on Iraq's Unresolved Disarmament Issues.  Under 
Lieutenant Colonel Heraud's leadership, the Al Samoud missile was destroyed.

Lieutenant Colonel Heraud is mentioned in the evidence of the Hutton Inquiry investigation into the circumstances surrounding the death of Dr. David Kelly.

External links
 United Nations Foundation, U.N. Wire, 12 February 2003
 Le Monde, Paris 12 February 2003

References

Iraq and weapons of mass destruction
Living people
French officials of the United Nations
1963 births